Oleksandr Grevtsov (born July 27, 1996) is a Ukrainian karateka competing in the kumite +84 kg division. He is 2018 European Team Championships medalist.

References

External links
 Ukrainian Karate Federation: Oleksandr Grevtsov

1996 births
Living people
Ukrainian male karateka
20th-century Ukrainian people
21st-century Ukrainian people